Metropolitan United Church is a historic Neo-Gothic style church in downtown Toronto, Ontario, Canada. It is one of the largest and most prominent churches of the United Church of Canada. It is located at 56 Queen Street East, between Bond and Church streets, in Toronto's Garden District.

History

The congregation, originally singularly Methodist, was founded in 1818. It was initially housed in a small chapel on King Street West (now the site of Commerce Court North). In 1833, a larger structure was completed on Adelaide Street. It moved to its present location in 1872 when the building was dedicated as the Metropolitan Wesleyan Methodist Church.

On 24 August 1870, Reverend Dr Egerton Ryerson, who had been the pastor of the earlier Methodist church on Adelaide Street, laid the cornerstone for Metropolitan Wesleyan Methodist Church in Toronto.  He was later a member and a trustee of the Metropolitan congregation for many years and his funeral was held there at the church as well.  

Ryerson notably supported the voluntary, bilingual (Ojibway and English) schools that Indigenous leaders and parents themselves wanted. Although Ryerson had no involvement with the establishment of the Canadian residential school system, his 1847 report on the proposed schools for the government of Upper Canada helped design the nature of the schools as Christianizing, anglicizing, industrial and residential, and whose purpose was to change the way of life of the Indigenous peoples into "industrious farmers." The system, which took away children from their families and culture, met with disastrous results and is today considered a form of cultural genocide as described by the Truth and Reconciliation Commission of Canada.

In 1925, the Methodist Church of Canada merged with the Presbyterians and Congregationalists to form the United Church of Canada. Metropolitan then acquired its current name. The first General Council of the United Church was held there in 1925. The church was mostly destroyed by a fire in 1928, but it was rebuilt in 1929 (keeping the same design) with the help of the Methodist Massey family, of Massey Ferguson fame. In 1930, Casavant Frères installed the largest pipe organ in Canada in the newly refurbished building. The church is also known for its 54-bell carillon that is regularly heard throughout the neighbourhood.

Today, the church is known for its progressiveness. It has long played an important role in Toronto's Gay and Lesbian community that is centered just to the north at Church and Wellesley. The church also offers a wide array of services for the poor and homeless.

Architecture

Designed by Henry Langley, who was to draw "the ubiquitous cloak of decorous gothicism over the face of Ontario in the 1870s", the church became known as

The church's ecclesiastical neighbours are St. Michael's Cathedral Basilica and the Cathedral Church of St. James, and the trio of similarly designed churches are a striking Christian witness adjacent to Canada's financial hub. The church's website describes the building in customary evangelical Protestant terms, regarding the nave rather than the chancel area as its "sanctuary".

Carillon

A very important part of the church is the carillon. A traditional carillon is a set of 23 or more bells which are played from a mechanical keyboard. The collection of bells at the Metropolitan United Church has been growing since April 2, 1922, when Chester D. Massey dedicated 23 bells in memory of his wife. These original 23 bells, cast by Gillett & Johnston in Croydon, England, are inscribed with the message "May the spirit of the Lord reach the heart of every one where the sound of these bells is heard." In 1960, Charles W. Drury and his wife donated twelve smaller bells, and by 1971, the collection was brought to a total of 54 bells.

When the church was first built in 1872, it was designed to accommodate a future carillon. The tower was designed to support the addition of bells and their immense weight (over forty four thousand pounds), by having seven-foot thick walls at the base which taper as they go up. At the top of the tower is a bell chamber open to the outside through which the carillon music can be heard.

Organ
The church also had Canada’s largest pipe organ (Casavant Frères Opus 1367) installed in 1930 following the fire which destroyed the previous organ. This instrument plays an important part in leading the church choir and ceremony every week. When it was first installed, there was a weekly recital which was widely known in the neighbourhood, and which received a great deal of recognition in the local papers. These two instruments, the organ and carillon, are an important part of the church’s image and are enjoyed wherever they are heard and especially by the patients of the St. Michael's Hospital.

Ministry team
Current Staff
 Minister of Faith Formation: The Rev. Jason Francis Meyers, 2019-present
 Children and Youth Animator: The Rev. Alana Martin, 2021-present
 Minister of Music: Dr. Jonathan Oldengarm, 2022-present
 Wayne C. Vance Organ Scholar: Joshua Duncan Lee, 2021-present

Carilloneurs

 F. Percival Price 1922–26
 John Skillicorn 1926–28
 J. Leland Richardson 1928–30
 Edmund Milroy 1930–32
 Sidney Giles 1932–36
 Edmund Milroy 1936–41
 Stanley James 1941–62
 James B. Slater 1962–97
 Gerald Martindale 1997–2016
 Roy Lee 2016–present

Organists and choir directors

 Mr. Thomas Turvey 1872–1873
 Dr. Frederic Herbert Torrington 1873–1907
 Mr. H.A. Wheeldon 1907–1913
 Mr. T.J. Palmer 1913–1917
 Dr. Herbert Austin Fricker 1917–1943
 Mr. John Reymes-King 1943–1946
 Dr. S. Drummond Wolff 1946–1952
 Mr. John Sidgwick 1952–1960
 Mr. Rowland Pack 1960
 Mr. Paul Murray 1961–1967
 Dr. Melville Cook 1967–1986
 Dr. Patricia Wright 1986–2022
 Dr. Jonathan Oldengarm 2022-present

Wayne C. Vance Organ Scholar 
 Joshua Duncan Lee 2021-

See also
List of carillons in Canada
List of oldest buildings and structures in Toronto
List of United Church of Canada churches in Toronto

Notes

References

External links

 
 Metropolitan United Church's sermon website

Bell towers in Canada
Burned buildings and structures in Canada
Carillons
Gothic Revival architecture in Toronto
Gothic Revival church buildings in Canada
United Church of Canada churches in Toronto